Thomas Rosales Jr. (born February 3, 1948) is an American actor and stuntman who has appeared in more than 100 films.

His first known appearance as a stuntman was in Battle for the Planet of the Apes in 1973.

Rosales' filmography includes; Dawn of the Planet of the Apes, RoboCop 2, Scarface, Need for Speed, Tremors 2: Aftershocks, Universal Soldier, Predator 2, L.A. Confidential, U.S. Marshals, Deep Impact, The Running Man, The Hunter, The Lost World: Jurassic Park, Speed, NCIS, The A-Team, Walker Texas Ranger   Blood In Blood Out and Analyze That.

Partial filmography
 1980 The Hunter as Anthony Bernardo
 1986 Raw Deal as Jesus
 1987 The Running Man as Chico
 1990 RoboCop 2 as Chet
 1990 Predator 2 as El Scorpio Gang Member
 1990 Alligator II: The Mutation as Victor
 1991 One Good Cop as Beniamino Associate #3
 1991 Ricochet as Gonzalo, Drug Dealer
 1991 Rush as Wino
 1992 Universal Soldier as Wagner, Terrorist Leader
 1993 Man's Best Friend as Mugger
 1994 CyberTracker as Man With Gun In Club
 1996 Tremors 2: Aftershocks as Oil Worker
 1997 The Lost World: Jurassic Park as Carter
 1997 Face/Off as a prisoner
 1999 Judgment Day as Payne's Man (uncredited)
 2000 Held for Ransom as Swamp Man #2
 2012 Act of Valor as Christo's RHM
 2014 Need for Speed as Valet
 2014 Dawn of the Planet of the Apes as Old Man
 2015 Our Brand Is Crisis as Mini-Vehicle Driver (uncredited)
 2017 The Beautiful Ones'' as Tuco

References

External links
 

1948 births
American male film actors
American male television actors
American stunt performers
Living people
People from El Paso, Texas